
NVC community W13 (Taxus baccata woodland), also known as Yew woodland, is one of the woodland communities in the British National Vegetation Classification system; it is the only Yew woodland community in the NVC.

This is a very localised community. There are two subcommunities:

Community composition

Only one constant species is found in this community, Yew (Taxus baccata). 

A single rare species, European Box (Buxus sempervirens) is also associated with the community.

Distribution

This community is almost wholly confined to chalk sites on the North and South Downs in southern England.

Subcommunities

There are two subcommunities:
 the Sorbus aria subcommunity
 the Mercurialis perennis subcommunity

References

 Rodwell, J. S. (1991) British Plant Communities Volume 1 - Woodlands and scrub  (hardback),  (paperback)

W13